Young Nick's Head is a headland at the southern end of Poverty Bay in New Zealand's North Island. The area is the landing place of the Horouta and Te Ikaroa-a-Rauru waka which carried Māori settlers to the region around 1350 AD. In Māori, the promontory is named Te Kuri o Pāoa (alternatively known as Te Kuri, or Te Kuri a Pawa).

The settlement of Muriwai is located just inland.

Name
Young Nick's Head has often been misinterpreted to be the first land sighted by the crew of Captain James Cook's ship, Endeavour on Friday 6 October 1769. Cook promised a reward to the first crewman to sight land and this reward was delivered to 12-year-old Nicholas Young, assistant to the ship's surgeon, in the form of two gallons of rum and the name of a prominent landmark.

Prior to Cook's arrival, the headland was known to Māori as Te Kuri o Pāoa, which translates to "The Dog of Pāoa". Māori legends recount that Pāoa lost his dog in the Poverty Bay area and the dog is still there waiting for his master to return. It is said at dawn the white cliffs resemble the outline of a dog in a crouching position.

Nick's Head Station
Nick's Head Station consists of the headland and its surrounding coastal, wetland and farming areas. The 661 hectare property is currently owned by New York financier John Griffin. After acquiring the property in 2002, Griffin engaged in a long-term plan to restore the area's vegetation and wildlife. Across the station over 600,000 trees were planted, 26 hectares of wetlands were restored, and a 2-metre-high predator-proof fence was constructed as native species such as Tuatara, Blue Penguin and Wētā were reintroduced. In 2005 Ecoworks, an ecological restoration company in Gisborne, successfully used solar-powered, acoustic-attraction methods and artificial burrows to establish breeding colonies of six pelagic seabird species at Young Nick's Head which had previously been severely affected by human colonisation and the introduction of new predators.

Protest of sale (2002)
Nick's Head Station was listed for sale in November 2000. In January 2002, John Griffin entered into a contract to purchase the property for $4 million after an earlier attempt made by the Ngai Tamanuhiri iwi failed through lack of finance. Protesting against foreign ownership of the culturally and historically significant land, a group of local Māori led by Tu Wyllie occupied Young Nick's Head and staged protests at Parliament.

After negotiations with iwi took place, then Finance Minister Michael Cullen announced in August 2002 that “Young Nick’s Head will be protected and the cliffs, pā site and peak of Te Kuri gifted into public ownership as part of a purchase deal for Young Nick’s Station”. Griffin also agreed upon purchasing the land to establish an open covenant through the Queen Elizabeth II National Trust to protect the remainder of the headland area from commercial development.

References

Headlands of the Gisborne District
History of the Gisborne District